Jackson Township is a township in Sullivan County, in the U.S. state of Missouri.

Jackson Township was erected in 1872, most likely taking its name from Andrew Jackson.

References

Townships in Missouri
Townships in Sullivan County, Missouri